Sangza (IPA: , Xiao'erjing: صًا ذِ) is a popular snack in north of China, consisting of deep-fried noodles in a twisted pyramid shape. The snack is made by pulling wheat flour dough into thin ropes, which are deep-fried. Bunches of the ropes are then shaped into rings, which are stacked into a pyramid.

Sangza is also eaten in other areas of China where the Hui minority live.

See also
Uyghur cuisine

Uyghur cuisine